The DNAgents is a comic-book series created by writer Mark Evanier and artist Will Meugniot and published by Eclipse Comics in 1983. It was later picked up briefly by Antarctic Press. In June 2006, reprinted issues were collected into DNAgents Volume 1 by Image Comics.

The series centers on a team of superheroes created through genetic engineering by the Matrix Corporation to act as superhuman enforcers for the head of the company.

Publication history
Both Marvel Comics and DC Comics expressed interest in publishing The DNAgents, but Evanier and Meugniot decided against signing with them because they would have had to give up the TV and merchandising rights, and since both Evanier and Meugniot had extensive backgrounds and contacts in the television industry, they were confident that they would be able to sell DNAgents as a TV series without help from a publisher. Mike Friedrich served as an agent for Evanier and Meugniot, submitting The DNAgents to five different publishers. When all five offered to publish it, they decided on Eclipse Comics, a large independent publisher, for the amount of creative freedom they were ready to allow and for their strong plan for promoting the series. Eclipse published DNAgents #s 1-24, from March 1983-July 1985 and New DNAgents #s 1-17 from Oct 1985-March 1987.

Antarctic Press released a single issue retelling their story.

The DNAgents reappeared in a cameo The Savage Dragon #41 (July 1997), retroactively setting the series in the Image Universe.

In 2004, About Comics reprinted several issues in digest form.

Cast of characters

DNAgents
Tank: The team's gentle giant with super-strength, and an armored weapon suit. Socially awkward, he seeks friendship and love with other people.
Surge: An impulsive, arrogant hothead who can control and generate electricity.
Amber: She could manipulate magnetic energy to create shields or energy blasts, or enable her to fly. Very outgoing, social and curious.
Rainbow: A telepath who can create and manipulate illusions, and dabbled in nude modeling.
Sham: The youngster of the team, and a shapeshifter and infiltration agent. However, he suffers from a strong, nearly crippling shyness of strangers, and considers the rest of his team the only people he can trust. He is also extremely sensitive to bright lights.

Other characters
Crossfire, another Eclipse comic of the era written by Mark Evanier, was a frequent guest character, and a romantic interest for Rainbow.
In issue #13, an attempt to create a new DNAgent resulted in Snafu, who later became a pet to Sham.
In issue #14, the DNAgents engaged in a "non-crossover" with the Teen Titans comic where each team faced a homage of the other with the DNAgents meeting up with "Project Youngblood" while the Titans dealt with the genetically-engineered "ReCombatants" in Tales of the Teen Titans #48. At the end of both stories, the homage/parody teams sacrificed themselves to save the main heroes.

Other media
 In 1986 a sourcebook was printed by Fantasy Games Unlimited for using the characters with their Villains and Vigilantes superhero role playing game. This book also contained conversion notes for Champions and Superworld RPGs.
 The DNAgents have a brief cameo appearance as guests at the wedding of Barbaric and Ricochet in the Savage Dragon comic series.

References

External links
 DNAgents Profiles at InternationalHero
 Mark Evanier's homepage: News Frome ME
 Presenting: DNAgents Super Special 

Eclipse Comics titles
Antarctic Press titles
Shadowline titles
Eclipse Comics superheroes
Comics publications
Fictional genetically engineered characters
Superhero teams